The Guinn Dipping Vat is a historic former cattle dipping facility in Ouachita National Forest, northwest of Mount Ida, Arkansas in the ghost town of Mauldin.  It is located south of Forest Road 37 west of United States Route 270.

Description:  It is a U-shaped concrete structure with a concrete and stone drip pad at one end, and is covered with boards.

History :  The vat was built  by Mack Guinn to serve the local farm population in its efforts to eradicate Texas tick fever.

The vat was listed on the National Register of Historic Places in 2006.

See also
 Cogburn Dipping Vat
 National Register of Historic Places listings in Montgomery County, Arkansas

References

Agricultural buildings and structures on the National Register of Historic Places in Arkansas
Buildings and structures completed in 1940
National Register of Historic Places in Montgomery County, Arkansas
1940 establishments in Arkansas
Plunge dips